Dr. Oscar James Cooper (1888–1972) was a physician and African-American cultural leader. He is known for cofounding Omega Psi Phi in Washington, D.C., the first fraternity founded by students at a historically black college. In Philadelphia, Pennsylvania, he was a charter member of the Pyramid Club.

Life and career 

Cooper was born in Washington, D.C. in 1888 and attended Howard University, receiving a Bachelor's degree in 1913 and a Doctor of Medicine in 1917. Cooper majored in biology and was a lab assistant for biologist Ernest Everett Just.

On November 17, 1911, he cofounded Omega Psi Phi, a historically African-American fraternity, along with Edgar Amos Love and Frank Coleman under the mentorship of Just. Discussion of the idea initially began between Love and Cooper, who were later joined by Coleman. Cooper was elected as the first secretary of the organization. Omega Psi Phi was the first black fraternity whose founders were at a historically black college or university, and eventually grew to over 750 chapters.

After medical school, Cooper moved to Philadelphia, where he practiced medicine. He was closely involved with the founding and early years of the Pyramid Club on Girard Avenue in Cecil B. Moore, North Philadelphia, which provided events and cultural engagement for African-American professionals in Philadelphia; at the time, racial segregation in the United States often barred professionals from access to other clubs. Cooper practiced medicine for 50 years prior to his death in 1972.

Legacy and recognition 

Dr. Cooper was honored by the Pennsylvania Historical and Museum Commission on October 2, 2021, with a historical marker at the site of his home and office in Cecil B. Moore. The marker was approved along with two other markers in Philadelphia County, honoring Anna Elizabeth Dickinson and the Wyck House and Rose Garden; it was one of 23 markers approved out of 39 applications across the state, officially announced on March 10, 2021. The text of the marker reads:

Dr. Oscar James Cooper (1888–1972)

One of the founders of Omega Psi Phi (OPP) at Howard University, the nation's first fraternity established at a historically Black college or university. Following graduation, Cooper became a physician and settled in Philadelphia where he spent his entire career. He continued his role as a founder of many influential organizations including the Philadelphia Chapter of OPP, was a charter member of the Pyramid Club, and supported many Black charities.

In addition to the marker, at the unveiling ceremony, the block of Jefferson Street between 16th and 17th was renamed to Dr. Oscar J. Cooper Way.

See also 

 List of people from Philadelphia
 List of Pennsylvania state historical markers in Philadelphia County

References 

1888 births
1972 deaths
African-American academics
Howard University alumni
African-American physicians
20th-century African-American people
Omega Psi Phi founders